The 1989 North Carolina Tar Heels baseball team represented University of North Carolina at Chapel Hill in the 1989 NCAA Division I baseball season. The Tar Heels played their home games at Boshamer Stadium. The team was coached by Mike Roberts in his 12th year as head coach at North Carolina.

The Tar Heels won the South Regional playoff to advance to the College World Series, where they were defeated by the Arkansas Razorbacks.

Roster

Schedule

|-
! style="" | Regular Season
|-

|-
! bgcolor="#DDDDFF" width="3%" | #
! bgcolor="#DDDDFF" width="7%" | Date
! bgcolor="#DDDDFF" width="14%" | Opponent
! bgcolor="#DDDDFF" width="25%" | Site/Stadium
! bgcolor="#DDDDFF" width="5%" | Score
! bgcolor="#DDDDFF" width="5%" | Overall Record
! bgcolor="#DDDDFF" width="5%" | ACC Record
|- align="center" bgcolor="#ccffcc"
| 1 || February 15 || at  || Vrooman Field • Conway, South Carolina || 4–2 || 1–0 || –
|- align="center" bgcolor="#ccffcc"
| 2 || February 25 || at  || College Park • Charleston, South Carolina || 2–0 || 2–0 || –
|- align="center" bgcolor="#ffcccc"
| 3 || February 25 || at The Citadel || College Park • Charleston, South Carolina || 5–6 || 2–1 || –
|-

|-
! bgcolor="#DDDDFF" width="3%" | #
! bgcolor="#DDDDFF" width="7%" | Date
! bgcolor="#DDDDFF" width="14%" | Opponent
! bgcolor="#DDDDFF" width="25%" | Site/Stadium
! bgcolor="#DDDDFF" width="5%" | Score
! bgcolor="#DDDDFF" width="5%" | Overall Record
! bgcolor="#DDDDFF" width="5%" | ACC Record
|- align="center" bgcolor="#ffcccc"
| 4 || March 1 || at Coastal Carolina || Vrooman Field • Conway, South Carolina || 10–14 || 2–2 || –
|- align="center" bgcolor="#ccffcc"
| 5 || March 4 ||  || Boshamer Stadium • Chapel Hill, North Carolina || 11–4 || 3–2 || –
|- align="center" bgcolor="#ccffcc"
| 6 || March 4 || Seton Hall || Boshamer Stadium • Chapel Hill, North Carolina || 2–1 || 4–2 || –
|- align="center" bgcolor="#ccffcc"
| 7 || March 5 || Seton Hall || Boshamer Stadium • Chapel Hill, North Carolina || 3–2 || 5–2 || –
|- align="center" bgcolor="#ffcccc"
| 8 || March 10 || || Boshamer Stadium • Chapel Hill, North Carolina || 5–7 || 5–3 || 0–1
|- align="center" bgcolor="#ccffcc"
| 9 || March 13 || vs U.S. International || Pete Beiden Field • Fresno, California || 9–8 || 6–3 || 0–1
|- align="center" bgcolor="#ffcccc"
| 10 || March 14 || vs  || Pete Beiden Field • Fresno, California || 1–8 || 6–4 || 0–1
|- align="center" bgcolor="#ffcccc"
| 11 || March 15 || vs  || Pete Beiden Field • Fresno, California || 6–7 || 6–5 || 0–1
|- align="center" bgcolor="#ffcccc"
| 12 || March 16 || at  || Pete Beiden Field • Fresno, California || 4–9 || 6–6 || 0–1
|- align="center" bgcolor="#ccffcc"
| 13 || March 17 || vs  || Pete Beiden Field • Fresno, California || 6–4 || 7–6 || 0–1
|- align="center" bgcolor="#ccffcc"
| 14 || March 18 || vs  || Pete Beiden Field • Fresno, California || 2–0 || 8–6 || 0–1
|- align="center" bgcolor="#ccffcc"
| 15 || March 21 ||  || Boshamer Stadium • Chapel Hill, North Carolina || 6–4 || 9–6 || 0–1
|- align="center" bgcolor="#ccffcc"
| 16 || March 24 ||  || Boshamer Stadium • Chapel Hill, North Carolina || 6–1 || 10–6 || 1–1
|- align="center" bgcolor="#ffcccc"
| 17 || March 25 ||  || Boshamer Stadium • Chapel Hill, North Carolina || 3–4 || 10–7 || 1–2
|- align="center" bgcolor="#ccffcc"
| 18 || March 26 || Clemson || Boshamer Stadium • Chapel Hill, North Carolina || 3–0 || 11–7 || 2–2
|- align="center" bgcolor="#ffcccc"
| 19 || March 28 ||  || Boshamer Stadium • Chapel Hill, North Carolina || 1–2 || 11–8 || 2–2
|- align="center" bgcolor="#ccffcc"
| 20 || March 29 || Pace || Boshamer Stadium • Chapel Hill, North Carolina || 3–2 || 12–8 || 2–2
|-

|-
! bgcolor="#DDDDFF" width="3%" | #
! bgcolor="#DDDDFF" width="7%" | Date
! bgcolor="#DDDDFF" width="14%" | Opponent
! bgcolor="#DDDDFF" width="25%" | Site/Stadium
! bgcolor="#DDDDFF" width="5%" | Score
! bgcolor="#DDDDFF" width="5%" | Overall Record
! bgcolor="#DDDDFF" width="5%" | ACC Record
|- align="center" bgcolor="#ccffcc"
| 21 || April 1 || at  || UVA Baseball Field • Charlottesville, Virginia || 4–3 || 13–8 || 3–2
|- align="center" bgcolor="#ccffcc"
| 22 || April 2 || at Virginia || UVA Baseball Field • Charlottesville, Virginia || 10–5 || 14–8 || 4–2
|- align="center" bgcolor="#ccffcc"
| 23 || April 3 ||  || Boshamer Stadium • Chapel Hill, North Carolina || 6–2 || 15–8 || 4–2
|- align="center" bgcolor="#ccffcc"
| 24 || April 4 || at  || Jack Coombs Field • Durham, North Carolina || 6–3 || 16–8 || 5–2
|- align="center" bgcolor="#ccffcc"
| 25 || April 8 ||  || Boshamer Stadium • Chapel Hill, North Carolina || 7–3 || 17–8 || 6–2
|- align="center" bgcolor="#ccffcc"
| 26 || April 9 || Virginia || Boshamer Stadium • Chapel Hill, North Carolina || 5–4 || 18–8 || 7–2
|- align="center" bgcolor="#ccffcc"
| 27 || April 11 || at Duke || Jack Coombs Field • Durham, North Carolina || 4–2 || 19–8 || 8–2
|- align="center" bgcolor="#ffcccc"
| 28 || April 12 ||  || Boshamer Stadium • Chapel Hill, North Carolina || 3–5 || 19–9 || 8–2
|- align="center" bgcolor="#ccffcc"
| 29 || April 13 || Cosstal Carolina || Boshamer Stadium • Chapel Hill, North Carolina || 2–1 || 20–9 || 8–2
|- align="center" bgcolor="#ffcccc"
| 30 || April 13 || Cosstal Carolina || Boshamer Stadium • Chapel Hill, North Carolina || 3–5 || 20–10 || 8–2
|- align="center" bgcolor="#ccffcc"
| 31 || April 16 || NC State || Boshamer Stadium • Chapel Hill, North Carolina || 7–6 || 21–10 || 9–2
|- align="center" bgcolor="#ccffcc"
| 32 || April 16 || NC State || Boshamer Stadium • Chapel Hill, North Carolina || 4–1 || 22–10 || 10–2
|- align="center" bgcolor="#ccffcc"
| 33 || April 18 || Duke || Boshamer Stadium • Chapel Hill, North Carolina || 4–1 || 23–10 || 11–2
|- align="center" bgcolor="#ffcccc"
| 34 || April 19 ||  || Boshamer Stadium • Chapel Hill, North Carolina || 3–7 || 23–11 || 11–3
|- align="center" bgcolor="#ccffcc"
| 35 || April 21 || at Georgia Tech || Russ Chandler Stadium • Atlanta, Georgia || 12–9 || 24–11 || 12–3
|- align="center" bgcolor="#ffcccc"
| 36 || April 22 || at Georgia Tech || Russ Chandler Stadium • Atlanta, Georgia || 1–2 || 24–12 || 12–4
|- align="center" bgcolor="#ccffcc"
| 37 || April 23 || at Clemson || Beautiful Tiger Field • Clemson, South Carolina || 4–3 || 25–12 || 13–4
|- align="center" bgcolor="#ccffcc"
| 38 || April 25 || Wake Forest || Boshamer Stadium • Chapel Hill, North Carolina || 6–4 || 26–12 || 14–4
|- align="center" bgcolor="#ccffcc"
| 39 || April 26 || at Wake Forest || Ernie Shore Field • Winston-Salem, North Carolina || 4–3 || 27–12 || 15–4
|- align="center" bgcolor="#cccccc"
| 40 || April 27 ||  || Boshamer Stadium • Chapel Hill, North Carolina || 4–4 || 27–12–1 || 15–4
|- align="center" bgcolor="#ccffcc"
| 41 || April 28 || at  || Wildcat Park • Davidson, North Carolina || 10–2 || 28–12–1 || 15–4
|- align="center" bgcolor="#ccffcc"
| 42 || April 29 || Davidson || Boshamer Stadium • Chapel Hill, North Carolina || 6–3 || 29–12–1 || 15–4

|-
! bgcolor="#DDDDFF" width="3%" | #
! bgcolor="#DDDDFF" width="7%" | Date
! bgcolor="#DDDDFF" width="14%" | Opponent
! bgcolor="#DDDDFF" width="25%" | Site/Stadium
! bgcolor="#DDDDFF" width="5%" | Score
! bgcolor="#DDDDFF" width="5%" | Overall Record
! bgcolor="#DDDDFF" width="5%" | ACC Record
|- align="center" bgcolor="#ccffcc"
| 43 || May 9 ||  || Boshamer Stadium • Chapel Hill, North Carolina || 14–4 || 30–12–1 || 15–4
|- align="center" bgcolor="#ccffcc"
| 44 || May 10 || at  || The Diamond • Richmond, Virginia || 4–1 || 31–12–1 || 15–4
|-

|-
! style="" | Postseason
|-

|-
! bgcolor="#DDDDFF" width="3%" | #
! bgcolor="#DDDDFF" width="7%" | Date
! bgcolor="#DDDDFF" width="14%" | Opponent
! bgcolor="#DDDDFF" width="25%" | Site/Stadium
! bgcolor="#DDDDFF" width="5%" | Score
! bgcolor="#DDDDFF" width="5%" | Overall Record
! bgcolor="#DDDDFF" width="5%" | ACC Record
|- align="center" bgcolor="#ccffcc"
| 46 || vs May 13 || vs Duke || Greenville Municipal Stadium • Greenville, South Carolina || 6–4 || 32–12–1 || 15–4
|- align="center" bgcolor="#ccffcc"
| 47 || vs May 14 || vs NC State || Greenville Municipal Stadium • Greenville, South Carolina || 4–2 || 33–12–1 || 15–4
|- align="center" bgcolor="#ffcccc"
| 48 || vs May 15 || vs Clemson || Greenville Municipal Stadium • Greenville, South Carolina || 4–5 || 33–13–1 || 15–4
|- align="center" bgcolor="#ccffcc"
| 49 || vs May 16 || vs Wake Forest || Greenville Municipal Stadium • Greenville, South Carolina || 6–2 || 34–13–1 || 15–4
|- align="center" bgcolor="#ffcccc"
| 50 || vs May 16 || vs Clemson || Greenville Municipal Stadium • Greenville, South Carolina || 4–12 || 34–14–1 || 15–4
|-

|-
! bgcolor="#DDDDFF" width="3%" | #
! bgcolor="#DDDDFF" width="7%" | Date
! bgcolor="#DDDDFF" width="14%" | Opponent
! bgcolor="#DDDDFF" width="25%" | Site/Stadium
! bgcolor="#DDDDFF" width="5%" | Score
! bgcolor="#DDDDFF" width="5%" | Overall Record
! bgcolor="#DDDDFF" width="5%" | ACC Record
|- align="center" bgcolor="#ccffcc"
| 51 || May 19 ||  || Boshamer Stadium • Chapel Hill, North Carolina || 3–2 || 35–14–1 || 15–4
|- align="center" bgcolor="#ccffcc"
| 52 || May 20 ||  || Boshamer Stadium • Chapel Hill, North Carolina || 5–3 || 36–14–1 || 15–4
|- align="center" bgcolor="#ccffcc"
| 53 || May 21 || NC State || Boshamer Stadium • Chapel Hill, North Carolina || 5–1 || 37–14–1 || 15–4
|- align="center" bgcolor="#ffcccc"
| 54 || May 22 || Clemson || Boshamer Stadium • Chapel Hill, North Carolina || 0–7 || 37–15–1 || 15–4
|-

|-
! bgcolor="#DDDDFF" width="3%" | #
! bgcolor="#DDDDFF" width="7%" | Date
! bgcolor="#DDDDFF" width="14%" | Opponent
! bgcolor="#DDDDFF" width="25%" | Site/Stadium
! bgcolor="#DDDDFF" width="5%" | Score
! bgcolor="#DDDDFF" width="5%" | Overall Record
! bgcolor="#DDDDFF" width="5%" | ACC Record
|- align="center" bgcolor="#ccffcc"
| 55 || May 25 || vs  || Dudy Noble Field • Starkville, Mississippi || 8–4 || 38–15–1 || 15–4
|- align="center" bgcolor="#ccffcc"
| 56 || May 26 || vs  || Dudy Noble Field • Starkville, Mississippi || 8–3 || 39–15–1 || 15–4
|- align="center" bgcolor="#ccffcc"
| 57 || May 27 || at  || Dudy Noble Field • Starkville, Mississippi || 2–1 || 40–15–1 || 15–4
|- align="center" bgcolor="#ffcccc"
| 58 || May 27 || at Mississippi State || Dudy Noble Field • Starkville, Mississippi || 0–6 || 40–16–1 || 15–4
|- align="center" bgcolor="#ccffcc"
| 59 || May 28 || at Mississippi State || Dudy Noble Field • Starkville, Mississippi || 7–1 || 41–16–1 || 15–4
|-

|-
! bgcolor="#DDDDFF" width="3%" | #
! bgcolor="#DDDDFF" width="7%" | Date
! bgcolor="#DDDDFF" width="14%" | Opponent
! bgcolor="#DDDDFF" width="25%" | Site/Stadium
! bgcolor="#DDDDFF" width="5%" | Score
! bgcolor="#DDDDFF" width="5%" | Overall Record
! bgcolor="#DDDDFF" width="5%" | ACC Record
|- align="center" bgcolor="#ffcccc"
| 60 || June 2 || vs Florida State || Johnny Rosenblatt Stadium • Omaha, Nebraska || 2–4 || 41–17–1 || 15–4
|- align="center" bgcolor="#ffcccc"
| 61 || June 4 || vs Arkansas || Johnny Rosenblatt Stadium • Omaha, Nebraska || 3–7 || 41–18–1 || 15–4
|-

|-
|

Awards and honors
Jesse Levis
First Team All-ACC
Third Team All-American American Baseball Coaches Association

Ron Maurer
Second Team All-ACC

John Thoden
Second Team All-ACC
Third Team All-American Baseball America

References

North Carolina Tar Heels baseball seasons
North Carolina Tar Heels baseball
College World Series seasons
North Carolina
Atlantic Coast Conference baseball champion seasons